Kyzyl-Yulduz (Qıźıl Yondoź) is a rural locality (a village) in Bayguzinsky Selsoviet, Ishimbaysky District, Bashkortostan, Russia. The population was 22 as of 2010. There are 2 streets.

Geography 
Kyzyl-Yulduz is located 19 km southeast of Ishimbay (the district's administrative centre) by road. Bolshebaikovo is the nearest rural locality.

References 

Rural localities in Ishimbaysky District